Chong Yee Fatt is a Malaysian football manager.

A former football player who plays for Perak FA in the 1980s, Yee Fatt has coached in his former team Perak, DRB-HICOM FC and Kuala Lumpur.

Yee Fatt has been announced as the new Perak head coach on February 2021, after the club has parted way with their former head coach Mehmet Duraković. After the team's poor performance in the league, which saw Perak in the 2021 Malaysia Super League relegation zone, Yee Fatt was relieved of his duty as head coach on 2 August. His assistant Shahril Nizam took charge of the team until the end of the season which saw Perak relegated for the first time after 28 years, although Yee Fatt were still employed with the team until the end of his contract in November 2021.

On 21 December 2021, another Malaysia Super League club Penang, announced Yee Fatt as the side's new assistant coach.

References

External links

Living people
Year of birth missing (living people)
People from Perak
Malaysian football managers